The Druid of Shannara is a fantasy novel by American writer Terry Brooks. The second book of his tetralogy of The Heritage of Shannara, it was first published in 1991.

Plot summary

The Druid of Shannara takes off where The Scions of Shannara left off, focusing on the story of Walker Boh as he attempts to fulfill the task given to him by the shade of Allanon, to return the Druid castle of Paranor to the Four Lands. Left in the Hall of Kings with the Asphinx attacking, Walker fends off the poison with his magic for days whereas the Asphinx could have killed any normal mortal. Finally realizing that there is only one way out of his predicament, he breaks off his arm in terrible agony. He fights his way through the Hall of Kings and amazingly finds his way to Storlock for the Gnome Healers to help him to the best of their abilities.

We are told right away that Coll is still alive, and the thing Par killed was a fake. Coll is imprisoned in a prison called Southwatch and is trying to figure out a way to escape.

Meanwhile, The King of the Silver River realizes the state of the Four Lands and makes a beautiful woman out of the elements surrounding him in his garden including a dove for a heart. The King tells his daughter, Quickening, of the task that she must carry out, for there is trouble in a lost city to the north, and the people to take with her.

Morgan Leah returns to Culhaven to carry out a final request from his old friend Steff who met his demise in The Scions of Shannara and quickly becomes imprisoned.

Rimmer Dall hears about Quickening and the rumors surrounding her appearances: that she's the daughter of The King of the Silver River and is making miracles happen. Rimmer Dall dispatches a dangerous assassin known as Pe Ell to kill her.

When Quickening goes to Culhaven, she quickly restores hope in the land by bringing back the beautiful Meade Gardens. Doing this, though, takes a toll on her and she becomes weak. Quickening falls into Pe Ell's arms and asks him to find her somewhere to sleep. Pe Ell does so, but doesn't kill her because he is attracted to her.

After Quickening recovers she requests Pe Ell to break Morgan Leah out of prison, and he does so, reluctantly. Morgan Leah is also attracted to Quickening and both he and Pe Ell agree to go on a journey with her. Morgan Leah because of his instant emotional attraction and Pe Ell because he wants to find out what makes her so special.

The three set off to go find Walker Boh.

While this is happening, Walker had returned home under the care of Cogline. Walker, still very weak, lies in bed as Cogline tries to coax Walker to get up and think positively. Rimmer Dall with a handful of Shadowen confront Cogline, bound to take out the last of the messengers of the druids. Cogline knew this was coming after hearing from Allanon and grabbed the Druid Histories before he and Rumor were killed.

Finally, Quickening reaches Walker Boh and heals him the best she can, though his arm is still missing. She takes the party north to get the black elfstone and in return Morgan will get his sword back, Pe Ell will increase his magical abilities, and Walker Boh will become whole.

They travel north and meet Horner Dees who is the only known survivor to ever go into Eldwist, an ancient city turned completely to stone. He had no intentions of ever going back, but he is soon persuaded. They finally make it to Eldwist and confront Uhl Belk, a brother of The King of the Silver River who has been there just as long. Days go by avoiding a creeper called The Rake, and the Maw Grint, the child of the Stone King, which is in the form of a gigantic worm-like creature that turns to stone everything in his path. Finally they were able to trick Uhl Belk into letting go of the black elfstone and as soon as this happens Pe Ell takes off with Quickening as a hostage. Confronted by Walker, Dees, and Morgan, Pe Ell stabs Quickening, though it appears that Quickening actually pushes herself against Pe Ell's magical blade, thus taking from Pe Ell the choice of killing her. Surprised, confused and enraged, Pe Ell flees. He doesn't get far before he dies in consequence of having killed Quickening, apparently from some kind of retaliatory magic which Walker suggests might have been placed on Quickening by the King of the Silver River to avenge her death.

Walker Boh, Morgan Leah, and Horner Dees take Quickening out of the city and up to the cliffs above Eldwist. Quickening bids farewell to Morgan and the others. She tells Morgan to sheath the broken Sword of Leah in the earth.  Quickening then calls for Walker, who takes her to the edge of the cliff. Using her magic, she communicates to Walker the purpose for her existence, which is to restore Eldwist, freeing it from its stone shell. At Quickening's request, Walker releases her, and she falls from the cliff and disintegrates. The dust of Quickening's body settles over Eldwist, and plant life spontaneously grows, quickly covering the whole peninsula, leaving the only visible stone the domed building wherein Uhl Belk resides. The magic also restores the broken Sword of Leah, a final symbol of the love between Morgan and Quickening.

The three of them leave, all taking different paths. Horner goes home, Morgan leaves to find Par, and Walker leaves to recover lost Paranor.

Also mentioned briefly in the book, Wren journeys with Garth to the village of Grimpen Ward in the Wilderun to seek out a seer called the Addershag, hoping to learn the fate of the Elves. Wren is told by the Addershag to go south to the Blue Divide and light a fire for three days above the caves of the Rocs. Wren and Garth escape Grimpen Ward, chased by the men who have been keeping the Addershag as a prisoner.

Characters
The characters are:
Walker Boh
Morgan Leah
[Quickening]
Pe Ell
Horner Dees
Uhl Belk
King of the Silver River
Carisman
Maw Grint
Cogline
Wren Elessedil
Garth
Par Ohmsford
Coll Ohmsford
Rimmer Dall

Shannara novels
1991 American novels
1991 fantasy novels
High fantasy novels
Del Rey books